Going to the Mat is a 2004 Disney Channel Original Movie. It debuted on Disney Channel on March 19, 2004.

Plot

Jason "Jace" Newfield (Andrew Lawrence) is the new blind student at his school, whose family recently moved from New York City to Salt Lake City, Utah. Thinking that his way to fit in is through playing the drums, he shows off in class only to find out that his band teacher, Mr. Wyatt, is also blind.

He later finds out from one of his friends, Vincent "Fly" Shu, that the only way to fit in is to be a jock. However, his other friend, Mary Beth Rice, is becoming increasingly irritated by his "New Yorkers rule" jokes and tells him that the reason no one is willing to be his friend is not because he is blind but because he is acting like a jerk. So in an effort to help Jace fit in, she asks him to try out for the wrestling team. "Fly" unwillingly tries out for the team with Jace, and they both make it. Jace has trouble winning matches at first, but slowly starts improving after receiving lessons from Mary Beth, whose father is the coach of the wrestling team.

Throughout the course of the season he slowly starts to fit in with some of the students that gave him a hard time at the beginning of his year at the school. At the end of the season, they go on to the state championship. It ends with a reporter interviewing Jace's teammates about his wrestling; they deny that he is even blind, because they realize that he is a significant person, and they accept him for who he is and not just a blind person, which is what they saw at first.

Cast
 Andrew Lawrence as Jason "Jace" Newfield 
 Alessandra Torresani as Mary Beth Rice 
 Khleo Thomas as Vincent "Fly" Shu 
 Wayne Brady as Mason Wyatt 
 D. B. Sweeney as Coach Rice 
 Billy Aaron Brown as John Lambrix 
 Brenda Strong as Patty Newfield 
 Brian Wimmer as Tom Newfield
 T.J. Lowther as Luke Nolan
 Marcus T. Paulk as Peter

Response
Going to the Mat is one of the most critically acclaimed Disney Channel original movies, garnering a Directors Guild Award for Stuart Gillard and a Humanitas Award Writing nomination for Chris and Laurie Nolan. It was also one of the highest rated Disney Channel movies on IMDb, and also holds a 73% approval rating on Rotten Tomatoes.

References

External links
 
 

2004 television films
2004 films
2004 drama films
2000s English-language films
Disney Channel Original Movie films
Sport wrestling films
Films directed by Stuart Gillard
Films about blind people
Films set in Utah
American drama television films
2000s American films